Puerto Rico Highway 166 (PR-166) is a by-pass in San Germán, Puerto Rico. The highway is an avenue which was built for drivers passing through PR-102 could bypass the downtown area of San Germán.

Among its intersections are PR-102 (to downtown San Germán, Cabo Rojo and Sabana Grande), PR-101 (to Lajas) and PR-122 (to PR-2).

Major intersections

See also

 List of highways numbered 166

References

External links
 

166
San Germán, Puerto Rico